Koolimadu is a village in Chathamangalam Gram panchayat in the Kozhikode district, state of Kerala, India.This village is known as India's first anti-tobacco village.

Anti Tobacco Initiative
Koolimadu is the first tobacco-free village in India. With the district administration declaring it tobacco-free, smoking has been banned in this tiny hamlet and people run the risk of being excommunicated for a day if they do not respect the ban. The village is located on the bank of Chaliyar around 3 kilometers away from Mavoor and 25 kilometers away from Kozhikode.

Koolimadu was declared tobacco free on 11 January 1995, after a year-long campaign that managed to rope in all sections of society.

The spark to ban tobacco was lit in a small local club, Akshara, in early 1994. During a routine meeting, a member lit up a cigar. The others present immediately protested, and with tempers running high, club office-bears slapped a ban on smoking on Akshara premises. Soon, another member suggested, "Why can’t we make the entire village tobacco free?"

That suggestion found many takers in the club, marking the beginning of a novel mission at the village, under the Chathamangalam gram panchayat.

Akshara took the initiative to tell the villagers about the evils of pan masala and smoking. "We held a door-to-door campaign, distributed pamphlets and roped in doctors to conduct classes," says club spokesperson Abdul Majeed.

With several middle-aged chain smokers at Koolimadu dying of lung diseases and oral cancer in the early 90s, their call for a ban found many takers. The club members claim they weaned away many who were at a risk of contracting smoking-related diseases.

Soon local traders agreed to join the campaign, Majeed says, and they haven't looked back since.

However, he admits, the going hasn't been easy. "We have to guard against the danger of addicts relapsing to their old ways. At the same time, the younger generation has to be checked," Majeed says. Then there are new visitors who have to be told about Koolimadu's unofficial ban on tobacco. The bus junction sports several banners and boards telling first-time visitors about the same.

Some results of the blanket ban may be visible on the health front. "Earlier, Koolimadu reported cases of respiratory inflammation, bronchitis and asthma. Due to passive smoking, even children were affected. Now such cases have become rarer," claims Dr K Alikkutty, a resident of Koolimadu since 1988.

Transportation
The nearest cities to the village are Kozhikode, Mavoor, Mukkom and Areakode.

See also
 Tobacco control

References

Villages in Kozhikode district